Orange County SC U-23 is an American soccer team based in Irvine, California. Founded in 2011 as the Los Angeles Blues 23, the team plays in USL League Two, the fourth tier of the American Soccer Pyramid.

The team plays its home games at the Orange County Great Park. The team's colors are black, orange, and white.

The club was known as Los Angeles Blues 23 in 2011, Pali Blues in 2012, OC Blues Strikers FC in 2013, OC Pateadores Blues in 2014 and Orange County Blues U-23 in 2015–2016.

History

Los Angeles Blues 23 was announced as a USL Premier Development League expansion franchise on April 7, 2011 as a replacement for the Hollywood United Hitmen franchise, which left the PDL for the National Premier Soccer League just before the start of the 2011 PDL season. The team is part of the development program of the Los Angeles Blues USL Pro team, which joined in 2011, and its sister club is the Pali Blues of the United Soccer Leagues W-League, whose name it adopted as of 2012.

The team played its first competitive game on April 29, 2011, a 0–0 tie with Fresno Fuego, and achieved its first victory on May 28, 2011, a 2–0 win over the Los Angeles Misioneros, with both goals – the first in franchise history – being scored by Daniel Martinez.

Players

Current roster

Year-by-year

Head coaches
  Agustin Rodriguez (2011)
  Federico Bianchi (2011–2016)
  Chris Volk (2017–2018)
  Jerry Tamashiro (2019)

Stadia
 Vanguard University Stadium, Costa Mesa, California (2014–present)
 Stadium by the Sea at Palisades Charter High School; Pacific Palisades, California (2011–2013)
 Titan Stadium; Fullerton, California 1 game (2011)

References

External links
 Official site
 Official parent club site

Association football clubs established in 2011
USL League Two teams
Soccer clubs in Greater Los Angeles
SC U-23
2011 establishments in California